NFL 98 (also known as NFL Prime Time 98) is a sports video game released for the Sega Genesis in 1997. Based on the National Football League, the game was a follow up to Sega's only football video game for the Sega Saturn, NFL '97. It is the last game in Sega's original Joe Montana/NFL series, which would be succeeded by NFL 2K.

Like Sega's previous two NFL releases (NFL '95 and NFL '97), NFL '98 was released exclusively for the North American market. It was not only the last American football video game for the Sega Genesis, but it was one of the last sports games released for a 16-bit console. The game runs under a modified engine of Prime Time NFL starring Deion Sanders with updated 96-97 rosters.

In July 1997, Joe Montana filed a $5 million lawsuit against Sega, claiming that Sega breached his license agreement in regard to the game.

Reception
Released after Sega had discontinued the Genesis, NHL '98 was one of the last games for the system and was largely ignored by critics. A brief review in GamePro was dismal, stating that "Although loaded with sharp features, like customization menus and stat tracking, the gameplay, graphics, and sound are disappointing. Players are clumsily animated, and it's easy to lose track of the ball when it's in the air—this game's almost too painful to play." They gave it a 3.0 out of 5 in control and a 2.0 in every other category (graphics, sound, and fun factor).

References

External links 
NFL '98 at Genesis Collective
NFL '98 at GameFAQs

1997 video games
NFL Sports Talk Football video games
North America-exclusive video games
Sega video games
Sega Genesis games
Sega Genesis-only games
Video games developed in the United States
Multiplayer and single-player video games